David Herbert Greene (November 4, 1913 – July 9, 2008) was an author and professor at Harvard University, Boston University, The College of New Rochelle, the U.S. Naval Academy and New York University, where he was chairman of the English Department. He was the official biographer of the Irish playwright J.M. Synge and worked on the original version of the game show Password as a 'word authority'.

He was born in Cambridge, Massachusetts to Herbert Greene and Annie Roche. He graduated from Harvard University in 1936. He studied in Ireland on a Harvard Fellowship.

He married Catherine Healy in 1939. During World War II, David served as an officer with the United States Navy.

He died in Boynton Beach, Florida of pneumonia.

References

External links
Guide to the David H. Greene Collection of Sean O'Casey Letters, 1944-1962, at NYU's Fales Library

1913 births
2008 deaths
Harvard University alumni
Harvard University faculty
Boston University faculty
New York University faculty